Pilgrims Rest is an unincorporated community in Etowah County, Alabama, United States.

References

Unincorporated communities in Etowah County, Alabama
Unincorporated communities in Alabama